German Earth and Stone Works was an SS-owned company created to procure and manufacture building materials for state construction projects in Nazi Germany. DEST was a subsidiary company  of Amtsgruppe W (Amt. W) of SS Main Economic and Administrative Office (WVHA). Both Amt. W and the WVHA were headed by Waffen-SS generals Oswald Pohl  and Georg Lörner.

The headquarters for DEST was located in Sankt Georgen an der Gusen, a small town in Austria where Gusen II, a subcamp of Mauthausen, was built in 1944.

History
DEST, founded on April 29, 1938, in Berlin, was administered by the VWHA for the purpose of procuring building materials and organizing slave labor and overseeing quarry operations.
The Sachsenhausen (1936), Buchenwald (1937), Flossenbürg (1938), Mauthausen (1938), Natzweiler-Struthof (1939), Gross Rosen (1940) and Neuengamme (1940) concentration camp sites were chosen because of their proximity to soil suitable for making bricks, or due to the close proximity of a brickworks factory or stone quarry. 
 
DEST was widely successful in the exploitation of slave labor, most of whom were Jews, in the quarries. Human labor was used cruelly, becoming one of the main tenets of war crime charges in the Nuremberg Trials. The director of the program, SS-Obergruppenführer Oswald Pohl, who was stationed in Berlin, was sentenced to death for war crimes in 1947 in Nuremberg, and executed in 1951.

In 1943, DEST changed its focus from stone industry to armaments. From this time the organization played a key role, helping the SS to enter some key war industries. This was underlined by its industrial park at St. Georgen and Gusen that made the SS a key supplier of aircraft fuselages (Bf 109, Me 262), carbines and machine guns to companies like BFW, Messerschmitt and Steyr-Daimler-Puch. To run its business with the inmates of the Gusen and Mauthausen concentration camps, DEST operated its headquarters of Granitwerke Mauthausen between 1940 and 1945 in the town of Sankt Georgen an der Gusen which was its biggest and most important "Werkgruppe" (industry group).

See also 
 Deutsche Wirtschaftsbetriebe

References

External links 
 The St. Georgen/Gusen headquarters of Granitwerke Mauthausen

Defunct companies of Germany
Economy of Nazi Germany
The Holocaust in Austria
1938 establishments in Germany
Construction and civil engineering companies established in 1938
Companies involved in the Holocaust
SS Main Economic and Administrative Office